Evgeniy Yuryevich Pashutin (born February 6, 1969) is a Russian professional basketball coach and former player. He is the current head coach of Parma Basket of the VTB United League.

Club playing career
Pashutin played in six teams during his professional playing career, but he did not win any major club titles. His only title as a professional club player was the Russian Super League title in 2003, which he won with CSKA Moscow.

National team playing career
As a player, Pashutin was a long-time member of the senior Russian national basketball team. With Russia, he played at the following major international tournaments: the 1994 FIBA World Championship, the 1995 EuroBasket, the 1997 EuroBasket, the 1999 EuroBasket, the 2000 Summer Olympics, the 2001 EuroBasket, and the 2002 FIBA World Championship. He won a silver medal at the 1994 FIBA World Championship, and a bronze medal at the 1997 EuroBasket.

Coaching career
Pashutin's first title as a basketball coach came in 2004, when he and his CSKA Moscow junior team won the junior level Euroleague Next Generation Tournament title. Months later, he won the Russian Junior League. After the 2003–04 season ended, Pashutin became the head coach of the Under-20 Russian National Team. After an impressive season with the CSKA junior team, Pashutin became the assistant coach in the professional senior men's CSKA Moscow team to Ettore Messina. In 2005, CSKA won the Russian Cup and the Russian Super League. In the summer of 2005, Pashutin won the 2005 FIBA Europe Under-20 Championship, and in the next season, CSKA won the EuroLeague, Russian Cup, and Russian Super League titles. In the 2006–07 season, CSKA were the runners-up in the EuroLeague, but won both the Russian Cup and Russian Super League titles. In 2008, CSKA again won the EuroLeague title and the Russian Super League titles, but didn't win the Russian Cup, in which they were the runners-up. Pashutin became the head coach of CSKA's senior men's team in the 2009–10 season – CSKA dominated the Russian Super League and won it, and also won the Russian Cup. CSKA also won the VTB United League, the renamed VTB Promo-Cup, for the second year in a row. In the EuroLeague, CSKA made the Final Four, but lost in the semifinals and finished in 3rd place. He left CSKA after that season.

Pashutin then moved on to UNICS Kazan, where he won the European-wide secondary level EuroCup championship, in the 2010–11 season. With UNICS, he also debuted as a head coach for the first time in the EuroLeague, in the 2011–12 season, in which UNICS reached the playoffs. He was also runner-up of the VTB United League in 2012.

Pashutin then signed with Lokomotiv-Kuban for the 2012–13 season – in his first season with the club, Pashutin once again led his team to EuroCup glory, as they won the 2012–13 edition. He also led his team to the finals of the VTB League, where they lost to his former team, CSKA Moscow. In the 2013–14 season, Lokomotiv played in the EuroLeague, reaching the Top 16 phase. Lokomotiv was also the runner-up in the Russian Cup, which they lost to UNICS. Pashutin left Lokomotiv after a disappointing finish in the VTB League season, where the club lost in the league's quarterfinals to CSKA Moscow.

Pashutin then returned to UNICS on November 19, 2014, after signing with the club for remaining 2014–15 season. That time, Pashutin's tenure was without much success. Despite Pashutin improving the club's performance, UNICS endured a failed season in all competitions – with a disappointing finish in the EuroLeague, where the team was eliminated after the regular season, a loss in the semifinals of the EuroCup, and a quarterfinals exit in the VTB League. In a surprise move, UNICS re-signed Pashutin to a new deal. In the 2015–16 season, UNICS was one of the favorites to win the EuroCup, but had another a failure and were eliminated in the first round of the playoffs. UNICS, however, qualified for the following season's EuroLeague, through the VTB League, by reaching the league's finals, although they lost in the finals to CSKA Moscow. In the 2016–17 season, UNICS, while playing in the new format of the EuroLeague, finished in a disastrous 15th place (second to last), and were eliminated in the quarterfinals of the VTB League. After that, UNICS announced that Pashutin would not return as the club's head coach for the next season.

In 2017, Pashutin briefly worked for the Wisconsin Herd of the NBA G League, as an assistant coach, before becoming the head coach of Avtodor Saratov, who Pashutin then led to the VTB League playoffs. On June 7, 2018, Pashutin signed with Cantù of the Italian top level Lega Basket Serie A (LBA). He left Cantù in January, after a 7–10 start in the LBA, and returned to Avtodor Saratov to once again become that club's head coach. On November 27, 2019, after a defeat against Parma, his contract has been terminated by Avtador Saratov.

On June 13, 2022, he signed with Parma Basket of the VTB United League.

Head coaching titles and honors

CSKA Moscow
 Russian Champion: (2009–10)
 Russian Cup Winner: (2009–10)
 VTB United League Champion: (2009–10)
 EuroLeague Third-place: (2009–10)

UNICS Kazan
 EuroCup Champion: (2010–11)

Lokomotiv-Kuban
 EuroCup Champion: (2012–13)

Russian national under-20 team
 FIBA Europe Under-20 Championship : (2005)

Personal life
Pashutin's younger brother, Zakhar, is also a former professional basketball player and a basketball coach.

References

External links
 Evgeniy Pashutin Player Profile at fiba.com
 Evgeniy Pashutin Player Profile at sports-reference.com
 Evgeniy Pashutin Player Profile at euroleague.net
 Evgeniy Pashutin Coach Profile at euroleague.net
 Evgeniy Pashutin Coach Profile at legabasket.it 

1969 births
Living people
1994 FIBA World Championship players
2002 FIBA World Championship players
Basketball players at the 2000 Summer Olympics
BC Avtodor Saratov players
BC Dynamo Moscow players
BC Spartak Saint Petersburg coaches
BC Spartak Saint Petersburg players
BC UNICS coaches
BC UNICS players
Israeli Basketball Premier League players
Maccabi Ra'anana players
Olympic basketball players of Russia
Pallacanestro Cantù coaches
PBC CSKA Moscow coaches
PBC CSKA Moscow players
PBC Lokomotiv-Kuban coaches
BC Avtodor coaches
Sportspeople from Sochi
Parma Basket coaches
Point guards
Russian basketball coaches
Russian expatriate basketball people in Israel
Russian expatriate basketball people in Italy
Russian expatriate basketball people in the United States
Russian men's basketball players
Wisconsin Herd coaches